Willhite is a surname. It may refer to:

Debbie Willhite (born 1951), U.S. political consultant and activist
Gerald Willhite (born 1959), U.S. football player
Kevin Willhite (born 1963), U.S. football player
Nellie Zabel Willhite (1892–1991), U.S. Pilot
Nick Willhite (1941–2008), U.S. baseball player